Letty Alonzo (born 1932) is a Filipina former actress from LVN Pictures who was typecast as a villain.  She starred in a few movies before leaving the entertainment industry.

Personal life
She was married to another famous LVN co-star, Mario Montenegro. They became the grandparents to actress Valeen Montenegro through her daughter, beauty queen Honeylet, who married footballer Iñaki Vicente.

Filmography
 1951 - Bohemyo
 1952 - Rodrigo De Villa
 1952 - Squatters
 1953 - Senorito
 1953 - 3 Labuyo
 1953 - Batanguena

References

External links

1932 births
Filipino film actresses
Living people